Seignelay is a commune in the Yonne department in Bourgogne-Franche-Comté in north-central France. The regional historian Vaast Barthélemy Henry (1797–1884) was born in Seignelay.

See also
Communes of the Yonne department

References

Communes of Yonne